Rape and revenge films are a subgenre of exploitation film that was particularly popular in the 1970s, but attracted controversy as a target of extreme cinema.

Explanation of the subgenre
Rape and revenge films generally follow the same three-act structure:

 Act I: The character is (violently) raped and maybe further abused, tortured or left for dead.
 Act II: The character survives and may rehabilitate themselves.
 Act III: The character exacts revenge and/or kills their rapist(s).

In Gaspar Noé's 2002 film Irréversible, the structure was reversed, with the first act depicting the revenge before tracing back the events which led to that point. Roger Ebert argues that, by using this structure as well as a false revenge, Irréversible cannot be classified as an exploitation film, as no exploitation of the subject matter takes place.

In popular culture 

 The genre has attracted critical attention. Much of this critical attention comes from feminist critics examining the complex politics involved in the genre and its impact on cinema more generally. More recently, a broad analysis of the rape-revenge genre and concept was published in Rape-Revenge Films: A Critical Study, by Alexandra Heller-Nicholas. The book argues against a simplistic notion of the term "rape-revenge" and suggests a film-specific approach in order to avoid generalizing films which may "diverge not over the treatment of sexual assault as much as they do in regard to the morality of the revenge act."

 In addition to American and French films, rape/revenge films have been made in Japan (e.g., Takashi Ishii's Freeze Me), Finland, Russia (The Voroshilov Sharpshooter), Argentina (e.g., I'll Never Die Alone; [2008]; original title: No Moriré Sola), Norway (e.g., The Whore [2009]; original title: Hora, and Sweden (e.g., The Virgin Spring [1960]; original title: Jungfrukällan which also won the Oscar for best foreign film at the 33rd Academy Awards.))

See also
 Captivity narrative
 Vigilante
 :Category:Rape and revenge films
 Redo of Healer

References

Film genres
Films about rape
Films about revenge
 
Thriller films by genre